The Center for Architecture is located in the neighborhood of Greenwich Village at 536 LaGuardia Place, between West 3rd Street and Bleecker Street in Manhattan, New York City. The center was designed by architect Andrew Berman and completed in 2003. Since its inception, the center, operated by the New York Chapter of the American Institute of Architects, has become an increasingly important cultural institution through its revolving exhibits on architecture, urban planning, urban design, and environmental planning. The center also puts on seminars, public feedback forums, project unveilings, and educational programs, as well as events and changing exhibitions.

The Center for Architecture opened to the public in October 2003.

Geothermal system
In the summer of 2003, the geothermal system for the Center for Architecture was installed. For three weeks, construction crews drilled two wells, each 1,260 feet (~ 384m) deep beneath the sidewalk. After drilling through layers or gravel, pea stone, overburden soil and bedrock, the wells were connected to make a closed loop system. The geothermal system consists of  pipes, heat exchangers and pumps for groundwater to flow through. The geothermal system cools the Center for Architecture during warm weather and heats it during the cold months by circulating water through heat exchangers. The system is based on the fact that the earth's temperature at a thousand feet below Manhattan is a constant . The heat exchangers use the temperature of the water to cool (or heat as demand requires) the air released into the  facility through air ducts. Air is blown over the chilled or heated water before traveling into the galleries and office spaces.

See also
 List of museums and cultural institutions in New York City
 Philadelphia Center for Architecture

References

External links

 

2003 establishments in New York City
Art museums and galleries in Manhattan
Greenwich Village